Palm Springs Unified School District Educational Administrative Center is a historic building located in Palm Springs, California. The building is a fine example of the short span of time that master architect E. Stewart Williams used the International Style of architecture for educational buildings in the early 1960s. It features a flat roof, deep overhangs, steel-frame construction, and large glass surfaces. After the mid-1960s Williams employed New Brutalism for educational structures. The building is located on the campus of Palm Springs High School. Its original lawn has been replaced by drought resistant desert landscaping. The building was listed on the National Register of Historic Places in 2016.

References

Office buildings completed in 1960
Buildings and structures in Palm Springs, California
National Register of Historic Places in Riverside County, California
Office buildings on the National Register of Historic Places in California
Modernist architecture in California
E. Stewart Williams buildings